Rudolf Waldemar Rømeling Krefting (3 February 1860 – 17 August 1942) was a Norwegian dermatologist. He was born in Kvikne. He is particularly known for his studies of the chancroid and the coccobacillus haemophilus ducreyi. He was the father of Kristian Krefting.

References

1860 births
1942 deaths
People from Hedmark
Norwegian dermatologists